Life as a BlackMan is a board game designed by Chuck Sawyer and published by Underground Games. It was originally released in 1999. The object of the game is to be the first to reach the "Freedom" space at the top of the board.

Gameplay
One player plays the role of the government; this role reads the prison cards, pays salaries, and handles legal transactions. The other players navigate the game as an 18-year-old African-American male or female. Players start by rolling a six-sided die to assign themselves one of three character types: Creative, Athletic, Intellectual. Next, players roll a six-sided die to be assigned one of four districts: Neighborhood, Military, University, Hollywood. The district determines the player's starting point. 

During each turn, the player will roll a four-sided die and move their pawn. Throughout the game, players will land on spaces requiring an Action Card. These cards cover a variety of topics, which include, crime, church, and racism. There are 360 Action Cards included in the game.  Depending on the card, the player may have to pay a fine, or move back spaces. 

Players also are able to collect a salary when landing on the Payday spaces.  Players can use this money for tasks such as, buying a car, getting married, and having children.

The game is won when a player successfully reaches the "Freedom" square on the board. The game typically lasts between 15 to 45 minutes.

Equipment
 1 24" x 24" game board
 1 9" x 12" Prison Platform
 1 4-sided die
 1 6-sided die
 6 game pawns
 12 decks of Action Cards:
 25 GlamourWood cards
 25 Black University cards
 25 Military cards
 30 Ghetto cards
 25 Corporate America cards
 20 Church cards
 25 Prison cards
 25 Life cards
 50 Career cards
 25 Racism cards
 25 Crime cards
 25 Police cards
 18 Character Type Cards:
 6 Creative
 6 Intellectual
 6 Athletic
 14 Transportation Cards
 5 "No Car" cards
 3 "Bucket" cards
 2 "Used Mid-Size" cards
 2 "New Sub-Compact" cards
 2 "New SUV" cards
 3 Debt cards
 A pack of BlackMan money

There are 360 cards in total.

References

External links
 Life as a BlackMan Homepage
 NPR on Life as a BlackMan from NPR
 Fox on Life as a BlackMan -- the Game? from Fox News
 

Board games introduced in 1999
Economic simulation board games
African-American culture
Stereotypes of African Americans